In Greek mythology, Lynceus (Ancient Greek: Λυγκεύς "lynx-eyed") may refer to the following personages.
Lynceus, one of the 50 Sons of Aegyptus.
 Lynceus, king in Thrace and husband of Lathusa, friend of Procne. Tereus gave Philomela to him after ravishing his wife's own sister.
Lynceus, son of Aphareus and one of the Argonauts.
 Lynceus, one of the companions of Aeneas in Italy who was slain by Turnus.
 Lynceus, one the dogs of the hunter Actaeon.

Also, Lynceus is a crater on Janus (moon of Saturn), named after Lynceus of Messenia in the legend of Castor and Pollux.

Notes

References 

 Apollonius Rhodius, Argonautica translated by Robert Cooper Seaton (1853-1915), R. C. Loeb Classical Library Volume 001. London, William Heinemann Ltd, 1912. Online version at the Topos Text Project.
 Apollonius Rhodius, Argonautica. George W. Mooney. London. Longmans, Green. 1912. Greek text available at the Perseus Digital Library.
 Gaius Julius Hyginus, Fabulae from The Myths of Hyginus translated and edited by Mary Grant. University of Kansas Publications in Humanistic Studies. Online version at the Topos Text Project.
 Pseudo-Apollodorus, The Library with an English Translation by Sir James George Frazer, F.B.A., F.R.S. in 2 Volumes, Cambridge, MA, Harvard University Press; London, William Heinemann Ltd. 1921. Online version at the Perseus Digital Library. Greek text available from the same website.
 Publius Vergilius Maro, Aeneid. Theodore C. Williams. trans. Boston. Houghton Mifflin Co. 1910. Online version at the Perseus Digital Library.
 Publius Vergilius Maro, Bucolics, Aeneid, and Georgics. J. B. Greenough. Boston. Ginn & Co. 1900. Latin text available at the Perseus Digital Library.

Mythological kings of Thrace

Kings in Greek mythology
Characters in the Aeneid
Greek mythology of Thrace